Finley Airport (IATA:FLY, ICAO:YFIL) is an airport operating out of Finley, New South Wales.

Facilities 
The airport has one runway made of asphalt, and with a total length of 900 m (2952 ft) and an approximate heading of 05/23.

References 

Airports in New South Wales